Liu Jian is a Chinese animator and film director based in Nanjing. Having originally studied painting at Nanjing University of the Arts, he began making animations in 1995. In 2007 he founded Le-joy Animation Studio. His first full-length animation Piercing I premiered at the Holland Animation Film Festival. His second feature-length film Have a Nice Day premiered in competition at the 2017 Berlin International Film Festival and won Best Animation Feature at the 54th Golden Horse Awards.

Filmography
 Piercing I
 Have a Nice Day (2017)
 Art College 1994 (2023)

References

Living people
Chinese animators
Chinese animated film directors
Year of birth missing (living people)